Stephen Kozmeniuk, known professionally as Koz, is a Canadian record producer, songwriter, engineer and instrumentalist. Production and writing credits include Madonna, Nicki Minaj, Kendrick Lamar, and Dua Lipa. Koz received 3 Grammy nominations at the 2021 Grammy Awards.

Discography

Songwriting and production credits

References

21st-century Canadian male musicians
Canadian record producers
Canadian songwriters
Living people
Musicians from Yukon
People from Whitehorse
Year of birth missing (living people)